Mustapha Bettache (20 January 1931 – 13 October 2005) was a Moroccan professional footballer who played for clubs in Morocco and France as well as the Morocco national football team and a football manager.

Club career
Born in the Habous neighborhood of Casablanca, Bettache began playing senior football with local side Wydad Casablanca. He would play professionally in France's Ligue 1 with Nîmes Olympique for nearly eight seasons. He was suspended from playing for six months in 1963, and returned to Morocco immediately after where he finished his career with Raja Casablanca.

International career
Bettache made several appearances for the full Morocco national football team, including qualifying matches for the 1962 FIFA World Cup.

Managerial career
After he retired from playing, Bettache became a football manager. He managed Ittihad Khemisset for several seasons, leading the club to the 1973 Moroccan Throne Cup final. He also managed COD Meknès, Olympique Club de Khouribga, Difaâ Hassani El Jadidi and SCC Mohammédia.

References

1931 births
2005 deaths
Footballers from Casablanca
Moroccan footballers
Moroccan football managers
Moroccan expatriate footballers
Morocco international footballers
Wydad AC players
Raja CA players
Nîmes Olympique players
Ligue 1 players
Expatriate footballers in France
Moroccan expatriate sportspeople in France
Botola players
Association football defenders
Ittihad Khemisset managers
COD Meknès managers
Olympique Club de Khouribga managers
Difaâ Hassani El Jadidi managers
SCC Mohammédia managers